Bolma recens is a large sea snail with a calcareous operculum, a marine gastropod mollusc in the family Turbinidae, the turban snails.

Subspecies
 Bolma recens clemenceae Bozzetti, 2010
 Bolma recens recens (Dell, 1967)

Distribution
This species is known to occur in deep water on the Kiwi Seamount, north of New Zealand; also off Madagascar.

References

 Powell A. W. B., New Zealand Mollusca, William Collins Publishers Ltd, Auckland, New Zealand 1979 
 Location of Kiwi Seamount in the Pacific
 Dell, R.K. 1967. Some Mollusca from deep water to the north of New Zealand, collected by the Tui, 1962. Records of the Dominion Museum 5: 305-315.
 Bozzetti, L., 2010. Bolma clemenceae (Gastropoda: Vetigastropoda: Turbinidae: Astraeinae) dal Madagascar meridionale. Malacologia Mostra Mondiale 69: 11-12

External links
 

recens
Gastropods of New Zealand
Gastropods described in 1967